Greatest Hits is a compilation album by the English band Roxy Music. It was released in 1977, when the band were on hiatus.

The band's first hit, "Virginia Plain", was re-released ahead of the album, peaking at number 11 in the UK (the original 1972 release had peaked at number 4). The edited version of "The Thrill of It All" is unique to this release, while the released single version (3:20) is available the 2012 boxed set Roxy Music: The Complete Studio Recordings. "Mother of Pearl" is an edit in that it does not crossfade into the next song, as it does on the 1973 album Stranded. The version of "Pyjamarama" on this collection is a remix of the original 1973 single which is also available on The Complete Studio Recordings, as well as the 1977 Polydor reissue of the "Virginia Plain" single.

Track listing 
All songs written by Bryan Ferry except as noted.

Personnel 
 Bryan Ferry – vocals, keyboards, guitar
 Andy Mackay – oboe, saxophone
 Phil Manzanera – electric guitar
 Paul Thompson – drums, percussion
 Brian Eno – keyboards (tracks 1-2 and 5-6 on side one)
 Rik Kenton – bass (track 1 on side one)
 John Porter - bass (tracks 2 and 5-6 on side one)
 Eddie Jobson – keyboards, violin (tracks 3-4 on side one, all tracks on side two)
 John Gustafson – bass (tracks 3-4 on side one, all tracks except 5 on side two)
 Chris Thomas – bass (track 5 on side two)

Charts

Album

Certifications

References

Roxy Music compilation albums
Albums produced by Chris Thomas (record producer)
Albums produced by John Punter
1977 greatest hits albums
Atco Records compilation albums